Carlos Moyá defeated Andrei Pavel 6–4, 6–2 to win the 2007 Croatia Open Umag singles event.

Seeds

Draw

Finals

Section 1

Section 2

External links
Singles draw
Qualifying draw

Singles